Reuben Arthur (born 12 October 1996) is a British male track and field sprinter who specialises in the 100 metres. He was a relay gold medallist with England at the 2018 Commonwealth Games, leading off the team of Zharnel Hughes, Richard Kilty, and Harry Aikines-Aryeetey.

Born in Islington, London, he represented Great Britain in age category competitions, including the World Youth Championships in Athletics, World Junior Championships in Athletics, European Athletics Junior Championships and European Athletics U23 Championships. He won his first international medal at the 2017 European Athletics U23 Championships, taking a silver with the 4 × 100 metres relay team including Theo Etienne, Kyle de Escofet and Ojie Edoburun.

He joined Enfield and Haringey Athletic Club and worked with coaches Edwin Stevens and Jonas Dodoo. He went on to study at Goldsmiths, University of London and won the British Universities 100 m title in 2017.

International competitions

References

External links
 
 
 

Living people
1996 births
People from the London Borough of Islington
Athletes from London
English male sprinters
British male sprinters
Commonwealth Games gold medallists for England
Commonwealth Games medallists in athletics
Athletes (track and field) at the 2018 Commonwealth Games
Alumni of Goldsmiths, University of London
Medallists at the 2018 Commonwealth Games